LinuxEDU is a Linux distribution based on Ubuntu (operating system). It is a free and open-source operating system that helps students and teachers to be able to provide better higher education all over the world.

Features 
Included with LinuxEDU is the Linux Terminal Server Project, a large number of educational applications including Kiwix, an open-source wiki offline reader, KDE Edutainment Suite, LibreOffice, Gnome Nanny and iTalc as well as many more.

See also 

 Ubuntu (operating system)

Ubuntu derivatives
Linux distributions